Chini ka Rauza is a funerary monument, rauza in Agra, India, containing the tomb of Afzal Khan Shirazi, a scholar and poet who was the Prime Minister of the Mughal Emperor Shah Jahan. The tomb was built in 1635. The Chini Ka Rauza is situated just 1 kilometre north of Itmad-Ud-Daulah's Tomb, on the eastern bank of Yamuna river in Agra, and 2 kilometres away from the Taj Mahal.

The facade of the monument is also known its glazed tile work, called kashi or chini in Mughal era buildings.

History

Also known as China Tomb, this is the mausoleum of Afzal Khan who was a Persian poet during the reign of Jahangir. Later he became the wazir during Shah Jahan's reign. Khan died in Lahore in 1639 and was buried here at Agra. The tomb is built facing the city of Mecca.

Architecture
The structure's architectural style is unusual because of the exotic architectural style and is unusually plain possessing a sultanate style unproportional dome.

Due to the inclement weather, the various types of enamel colours have worn away from the tiles. In the facades, the builders used earthenware pots to reduce the weight of the concrete filling which was followed in Rome and Egypt.

See also

 Agra Fort
 Itmad-Ud-Daulah
 Taj Mahal
 Ram Bagh

References

Notes

External links

Mughal architecture
1635 establishments in Asia
Tourist attractions in Agra district